The Canadian forestry industry is a major contributor to the Canadian economy. With 39% of Canada's land acreage covered by forests, the country contains 9% of the world's forested land. The forests are made up primarily of spruce, poplar and pine. The Canadian forestry industry is composed of three main sectors: solid wood manufacturing, pulp and paper and logging. Forests, as well as forestry are managed by The Department of Natural Resources Canada and the Canadian Forest Service, in cooperation with several organizations which represent government groups, officials, policy experts, and numerous other stakeholders. Extensive deforestation by European settlers during the 18th and 19th centuries has been halted by more modern policies. Today, less than 1% of Canada's forests are affected by logging each year. Canada is the 2nd largest exporter of wood products, and produces 12.3% of the global market share. Economic concerns related to forestry include greenhouse gas emissions, biotechnology, biological diversity, and infestation by pests such as the mountain pine beetle.

Forest Management 

Canada is the leading country for sustainable forest management with a sciences-based approach to ensure proper and sustainable management of Canadian ecosystems. Almost 90% of the Canadian forests are publicly owned and controlled by their provinces and territories. Each provincial and territorial government allot early levels of harvest and require regenerative practices upon completion of harvesting Additionally, for companies to harvest public lands they must produce a unique forest management plan and consult the public. 6% of Canadian forests are privately owned and must comply with provincial and federal laws and legislations. 2% of the forests are federally owned and the remaining 2% are owned by Indigenous Peoples.

The governments are assisted by the National Advisory Board on Forest Research, established in 1997 and focusing on strategic issues, and the Forest Sector Advisory Council, which represents the interests of the multitude of private, non-profit and academic stakeholders in Canadian forestry. The Canadian Council of Forest Ministers, composed of 14 ministers representing the federal government and the various provinces and territories, is the main tool for dissemination of national and international policy throughout the country.

Forests

Government legislation protects about 8 percent of the forested area, of which less than 1 percent is logged annually; this latter portion is required to be reforested after being harvested. It is one of the five countries with the largest amount of forest, along with Russia, Brazil, China and the US; together, these countries control more than half of the world's forested land area.

History of forestry
European forestry in Canada is thought to date back to the 11th century, when Leif Erikson first landed off the coast of what is believed to be Newfoundland. Large scale forestry did not begin until European settlers landed several centuries later. The area that is now Canada experienced significant deforestation during the 18th and 19th centuries, as a booming population of settlers cleared the land; this pattern was also seen elsewhere in North America. Changes in management strategies in the 20th and 21st centuries have been able to halt the trend toward deforestation.

Forestry today

Forestry is a major industry in Canada, contributing over $24.6 billion in GDP to the economy in 2017. In the same year, over 209,940 people were directly employed by the forestry industry, contributing 1.1 percent of total employment. The majority of forestry employees are found in Quebec, British Columbia and Ontario, and for the most part they work in the softwood trade. Conifer release programmes have been perfected in Canada since the 1950s. As of 2011, Canada contributed 10 percent of the world's sawnwood, 10 percent of the pulp for paper, 9 percent of the industrial roundwood, 4 percent of the wood-based panels and 3 percent of the paper and paperboard. In 2010, Canada enjoyed a significant surplus in their balance of trade, mainly due to being the second-largest exporter of forestry products globally. Much of this is exported, with Canada exporting 20 percent of the world's sawnwood, 18 percent of the pulp for paper, 8 percent of the paper and paperboard, 5 percent of the industrial roundwood and 5 percent of the wood-based panels.

Environmental concerns

Canada's ecosystems depend on large forested areas. However, the average temperatures of Canadian forests have been increasing due to climate change. For instance, the Canadian boreal forest have experienced a 1.5 °C increase since. There is even evidence that some regional areas within the western boreal forest in British Columbia have increased by 2°C since 1948, and there is a high likelihood that these regions rise by another 3 or 4 degrees by the end of the century, thus permanently changing this ecosystem. Climate change is negatively impacting the productivity of Canadian forests.

Canada is a participant in several international protocols and conferences in areas that affect its forested land. As a signatory to the Paris climate accord, reductions in greenhouse gas emissions are required. Biotechnology and its effect on forested land is a concern, and the conservation of the forest's biological diversity is a major priority. The latter was the subject of the country's first Conference of the Parties to the Convention on Biological Diversity report.

Natural Disturbances 

In 2016, 15,489,117 hectares (38,274,440 acres) of Canadian forests were destroyed by insects. Two main insects place the Canadian forestry industry at risk, the mountain pine beetle and the emerald ash borer. The mountain pine beetle has destroyed much of the western lodgepole pine stock. The pine beetle has thrived due to a combination of large stands of mature pine and successive warm winters. While extensive logging, prescribed burning and pest reduction techniques have been used to attempt to contain the beetle, large stands of dead trees remain, posing a significant threat of wildfire. Over half of these are caused by humans, but nature-caused fires (generally started by lightning strikes) cover over 80 percent of the total burn area, as they are often in remote areas of the country.

The emerald ash borer is another major concern to Canadian forests responsible for the rapid decay of forests in Manitoba, Ontario, Québec, New Brunswick, and Nova Scotia. The emerald ash borer was introduced into North America from Eastern Asia in the 1990s It is estimated that the beetle has caused $1.422 billion in damages since the introduction to Canada. In response, Canada has responded by creating laws and regulations to reduce human-facilitated transport of the beetle. Additionally, the CFIA has cut down thousands of trees to create a buffer zone to halt the progression of the emerald ash borer.

Assisted migration 

Assisted migration is the act of moving plants or animals to a different habitat. In Canada, this is described as a climate change adaptation program proposal, most often discussed in the context of the relocalization of trees and forests. Indeed, as the Canadian climate gets warmer, tree species' become less adapted to the conditions of their historical southern or downhill range and more adapted to the climatic condition of areas north or uphill of their historical range.

In the late 2000s and early 2010s, the Canadian provinces of Alberta and British Columbia modified their tree reseeding guidelines to account for the northward and uphill movement of forests' optimal ranges. British Columbia even gave the green light for the relocation of a single species, the Western Larch, 1000 km northward.

See also 
 Minister of Forestry (Canada)
 Canadian Forestry Corps
 Canadian Forestry Association
 Canadian Forest Service
 Natural Resources Canada
 Tree Canada, an NGO

References